KKWA (96.3 FM) is a commercial radio station licensed to West Linn, Oregon, and broadcasting to the Portland metropolitan area. KKWA airs a Contemporary Christian Music radio format branded as "WAY-FM".

The transmitter is located off Southwest Fairmount Boulevard, amid other Portland-area FM and TV towers. KKWA broadcasts at only 1,350 watts while many Portland-area FM stations operate at 100,000 watts. Because the tower is 386 meters (1266 feet) height above average terrain, a bit less than the Empire State Building, the station's signal extends over Portland and its nearby suburbs in Oregon and Washington.

History

Warm Springs location
On January 18, 1986, the station signed on the air in Warm Springs at 96.5 FM. Its original call sign was KWSI and it aired an adult contemporary music format. Warm Springs is a community in the north-central part of Oregon, with about 2400 residents. In 1991, KWSI changed its call letters to KTWI and simulcast the classic rock format of KTWS 98.3 FM in Bend, Oregon, as "The Twins 98-3 & 96-5".  In 1995, KTWI became “Warm 96” with a mix of soft adult contemporary and country.  In 1996, the station began a simulcast with KIJK, branded as “More Country 95/96-5”.

In 1998, the station changed its call letters to KWEG and returned to a hot adult contemporary format as "The Eagle".

In 2000, the station changed its call letters to KWPK and rebranded as "The Peak". In 2001, the station became KRCO-FM with a country music format. On July 24, 2002, the station changed call letters to KWLZ-FM and switched to an active rock format, branded as "Lazer 96-5". On December 13, 2004, KWLZ-FM shifted its format to classic rock, still under the "Lazer 96-5" branding. On August 22, 2008, KWLZ-FM switched to a simulcast of talk-formatted KBNW 1340 AM Bend, Oregon, branded as "News Radio Central Oregon".

Move to Portland
On September 8, 2015, KWLZ-FM's 96.5 FM transmitter in Warm Springs went silent, ending its simulcast with KBNW. The station owner, 3 Horizons, had asked the Federal Communications Commission for permission to move to 96.3 FM in the Portland radio market, using West Linn as its new city of license. The move would increase the value of the station and allow it to sell advertising in the Portland area, a market of more than 2.3 million residents.

On September 18, 2015, KWLZ-FM's 96.3 Portland-area signal signed on the air with a rock-leaning classic hits format, branded as "96.3 KWLZ". KWLZ-FM's license was granted for its West Linn facilities on September 24.

On August 1, 2016, at 5 p.m., Alpha Media began operating KWLZ-FM under a Local Marketing Agreement with 3 Horizons, and flipped the station's format to Rhythmic CHR, branded as "WE 96-3". The station changed its call sign to KWEE on August 12, 2016.

On June 4, 2019, 3 Horizons LLC announced that it would sell KWEE to WAY-FM Network, whose Christian AC programming was also heard on K283BL via iHeartMedia’s KFBW-HD2. The sale also ended its LMA with Alpha Media, as WAY-FM would move the Christian AC format to KWEE upon the closing of the sale. On September 16, 2019, Alpha transitioned KWEE's format to translator K275CH (102.9 FM), replacing KXTG's Sports simulcast, relaunching as "WE 102.9". The sale was completed on October 2, at which point 96.3 adopted the WAY-FM format under new callsign KKWA.

Former logo

References

External links

FCC construction permit

Radio stations established in 1986
1986 establishments in Oregon
Contemporary Christian radio stations in the United States
KWA (FM)
WAY-FM Network